Bangladesh and Spain maintain diplomatic relations: Bangladesh maintains its embassy in Madrid while Spanish embassy is located in Dhaka.

Economic relations
Both countries enjoy warm diplomatic relations. Spain planned an event in 2014 to promote investment in Bangladesh.

References

 
Spain
Bangladesh